Arabelia is a genus of spiders in the family Liocranidae. It was first described in 2009 by Bosselaers. , it contains only one species, Arabelia pheidoleicomes, found in Greece and Turkey.

References

Liocranidae
Monotypic Araneomorphae genera
Spiders of Asia